This is a list of songs recorded and released by British pop group Brotherhood of Man.

0–9 
1999

A 
A Better Tomorrow
Ain't That Tellin' You People
Alison
A Little Bit More
A Little Bit of Heaven
All By Myself
All Night
Always You and I
Andrea Android
Andy McDougle
Angelo
Annie's Song

B 
Bag of Money
Beautiful Lover
Being With You
Be My Loving Baby
Better to Have Loved
The Big Race
Blame It on the Boogie
Break Up
Bright Eyes
Broken Hearted Avenue
Brown Girl in the Ring
Butterfly Ball
Butterfly Butterfly
The Butterfly Children
Butterfly Rock
Bye Bye One Kiss Goodbye

C 
California Sunday Morning
Can’t Stop Loving You
Caravan
Catch Me Catch Me if You Can
Chanson D'Amour
Cinderella
The Circus Came to Town
Closer Closer
Copacabana (At the Copa)
Crazy
 Cross My Heart
Cry Baby Cry
Crying
Cry Thief

D 
D.I.S.C.O.
Daisy
Dance Yourself Dizzy
Dancing Queen
Daydreamer
Didn't I Blow Your Mind
Do Be Do
Don't Give Up on Us Baby
Don't Go Breaking My Heart
Do Ya Think I'm Sexy
Do Your Thing
Dream On

E 
Ernie
Evergreen
Every Day of My Life

F 
Feels Like I'm in Love
Figaro
Finders Keepers
Following a One Man Band
Follow Me
For Old Times Sake
For the Rest of Our Lives
For You
Freedom

G 
Gold
Goodbye Goodbye
Goodnight Sleepyhead
Good Things Happening
Got a Funny Feeling
Got to Get You into My Life
Greatest Love
Greenhouse
Guess Who's Taking You Out Tonight
Gypsy

H 
Hanging On
Hang On
Happy Birthday
Happy Ever After
Have You Been a Good Boy
He Ain't Heavy He's My Brother
Heartbreaker
He Looked at Me
Hey D.C.
Higher Than High
High on the Thought of You
Highwayman
Hi Ho (Together We Go)
Hip to Be Square
Honey Don't Throw Our Love Away
Hot Love
How 'Bout Us
How Can You Love
How Deep Is Your Love

I 
I Could Be So Good for You
I Don't Need It
If You Leave Me Now
I Give You My Love
I'll Go Where Your Music Takes Me
I'll Never Let You Down
I'll Take You Higher Than High
I Love Everybody
Images
I'm Gonna Make You Love Me
I'm in a Dancing Mood
I'm Not in Love
I'm so Much in Love
In Love
I Saw Yesterday Today
Is it Love
Isn't it Sad / She Looked at Me
It's Great to Be a Butterfly
I've Got the Music in Me
I Wanna Go to Africa
I Wanna Stay With You
I Will Survive

J 
Jack the Lad
Join the Party
Juke Box Hero
Jukebox Serenade
Just When it Seems Impossible

K 
Kiss Me Kiss Your Baby
Kiss Me Senor
Knock on Wood

L 
Lady
Lady Lady Lady Lay
Lady Liar
Lay All Your Love On Me
Le Freak
Let Me Sleep On It
Let's Get the Show On the Road
Let's Love Together
Light from Your Window
Lightning Flash
Live and Let Die
Living in the Land of Love
Lonely One
Love Grows
Love is a Good Foundation
Love, Lines, Angles and Rhymes
Love Me for What I Am
Love Me Like I Love You
Love One Another
Love's Bound to Get Ya
Lullaby

M 
Maybe the Morning
Middle of the Night
Midnight Express
Miss You Nights
More Than in Love
The Moth Ball Spoof
Moth Gang
Movin' With Susan
Much Better than You
Mull of Kintyre
My Eyes Adored You
My Sweet Rosalie

N 
 New York City
Night Fever
The Night of My Life
No Smoke Without Fire
Nothing in the World
Now

O 
Oh Boy (The Mood I'm In)
Ole Ole
One Day at a Time
One Day I'll Fly Away
One Night
Only Love
Our World of Love

P 
Papa Louis
Part of My Life
Penny for Your Thoughts
People Over the World
Piece Patrol
Pop Muzik
Proud Mary
Puppy Love
Put Out the Fire
Put Your Hand in the Hand

Q

R 
Reach out Your Hand
Remember You're a Womble
Ring My Bell
Rivers of Babylon
Rock Me Baby
Roulette
Run Like Hell

S 
Safety First
Sailing
Saturday Night
Save Your Kisses for Me
Say a Prayer
Send in the Clowns
Shame on You Baby
Shang a Lang / Bye, Bye, Baby (Baby Goodbye)
She's Out of My Life
Shimmy Shimmy Shamay
Silly Love Songs
Singing a Song
Singin' in the Rain
Sing in the Sunshine
Sleeping Beauty
Somebody Else
Something Wonderful
Song Sung Blue
Spring of 1912
Star
Stayin' Alive
Sugar Honey Love
Sugar Mouse
Sunshine All the Way
Sweet Lady from Georgia

T 
Taxi
Tell Me How
 Tell Me Tell Me Tell Me
There’s a Mountain
This Boy
This is the Night
This World is Ours
Three Times a Lady
Tie a Yellow Ribbon
Together We Are Beautiful
Tomorrow
To-night's the Night
Too Late the Hero
Too Many Heartaches
Tragedy
Tu Eres Bonita
Tugging
Two Can Live as Cheap Babe

U 
United We Stand
Use It Up and Wear It Out

V 
Vanishing Lady

W 
We Can Make It
We Don't Talk Anymore
Welcome Sunday Morning
We’re the Brotherhood of Man
What More Can I Say
What's Another Year
What Would Happen if Christmas Never Came
When I Need You
When Love Catches Up On You
When Summer's Gone
When the Kissing Stops
When Will I See You Again
When You're in Love with a Beautiful Woman
Where Are You Going to My Love
Willie
Will You Love Me Tomorrow
Wings
Without You
With You I'm Born Again
Woman
Woman in Love
Working My Way Back to You
The World Gets Better With Love

X

Y 
Y.M.C.A.
Yes Sir I Can Boogie
You and I
You are Love
You Are What You Are
You Can Depend on Me
You Can Say That Again
You're the Greatest Lover
You're the One That I Want / Summer Nights

Z 

Brotherhood of Man